Marcos de Sobremonte (1609 – August 10, 1681) was a Roman Catholic prelate who served as Bishop of Puerto Rico (1677–1681).

Biography
Marcos de Sobremonte was born in 1609 in Caracas. On September 13, 1677, he was selected by the King of Spain and confirmed by Pope Innocent XI as Bishop of Puerto Rico. He served as Bishop of Puerto Rico until his death on August 10, 1681.

References

External links
 (for Chronology of Bishops) 
 (for Chronology of Bishops) 

1609 births
1681 deaths
Bishops appointed by Pope Innocent XI
17th-century Roman Catholic bishops in Puerto Rico
Roman Catholic bishops of Puerto Rico